Tibouchina aegopogon is a species of flowering plant in the family Melastomataceae, native to Bolivia and Brazil.

References

aegopogon
Flora of Bolivia
Flora of Brazil
Plants described in 1850